Congoharpax is a genus of praying mantis in the family Galinthiadidae. The following species are recognised:
Congoharpax aberrans 
Congoharpax boulardi 
Congoharpax coiffaiti 
Congoharpax judithae

See also
List of mantis genera and species

Galinthiadidae